

Qualification rules
A nation may earn up to 2 quota places per event, except for women's trap and skeet, which is entitled only to a maximum of one per NOC.

The qualification consists of two parts:

 A minimum qualification score (MQS) that each shooter has to perform in at least one ISSF championship to be eligible for the Olympics in that certain event. The MQS are set rather low.
 A number of quota places in each event, adding up to a total of 390. The quota places are won by the national federations when their shooters rank high in ISSF championships (at ISSF World Cups, only the best-ranking shooter yet without a Quota place gains one, while at the World Championships there are more places at stake). Some quota places are left as wild cards.

Each quota place gives the national federation the right to send one shooter to compete in that event. However, there is a maximum of two shooters per event and country. On the other hand, a shooter filling a quota place in one event may compete in other events as well, as long as the MQS have been fulfilled. Most shooters combine events in this way (apart from those in 25 metre rapid fire pistol, skeet and women's trap, who generally do not, because there are no events similar to theirs on the program).

Summary

Timeline

50 m rifle three positions men

50 m rifle prone men

10 m air rifle men

50 m pistol men

25 m rapid fire pistol men

10 m air pistol men

Trap men

Double trap men

Skeet men

50 m rifle three positions women

10 m air rifle women

25 m pistol women

10 m air pistol women

Trap women

Skeet women

References

Qualification for the 2008 Summer Olympics